Squamanita paradoxa, commonly known as powdercap strangler, is a species of fungus in the family Tricholomataceae. It is a parasitic fungus that grows as a gall on another fungus, Cystoderma amianthinum. The species was first described as Cystoderma paradoxum by American mycologists Alexander H. Smith and Rolf Singer in 1948, based on specimens collected in Mount Hood National Forest in Oregon. Cornelis Bas transferred the species to the genus Squamanita in 1965. In 2011, it was reported from Worcestershire, UK.

References

External links

Fungi described in 1948
Fungi of Europe
Fungi of North America
Tricholomataceae
Taxa named by Alexander H. Smith